The 1900–01 season was East Stirlingshire Football Club's first season in the Scottish Football League, being admitted to the Scottish Football League Second Division. The club also competed in the Scottish Cup and the minor Stirlingshire Cup.

Fixtures and results

Scottish Second Division

League table

Results by round

Scottish Cup

Other

Stirlingshire Cup

See also
List of East Stirlingshire F.C. seasons

References

External links
East Stirlingshire FC official site

East Stirlingshire F.C. seasons
East Stirlingshire